Aesculus parviflora, the bottlebrush buckeye, is a species of suckering deciduous shrub in the family Sapindaceae.  The species is native to the southeastern United States, where it is found primarily in Alabama and Georgia, with a disjunct population in South Carolina along the Savannah River. Its natural habitat is in mesic forests, on bluffs and in ravines.

This plant is highly poisonous to humans if eaten. Symptoms include muscle weakness, paralysis, vomiting, diarrhea, and death. It has also been reported to be toxic to pets.

Description
Aesculus parviflora grows to 2–4 m tall. The leaves are arranged in opposite pairs, palmately compound with 5-7 leaflets, each leaflet short-stalked, 12–22 cm long and 5–10 cm broad, with an entire margin. The flowers are produced in conspicuous erect panicles 20–50 cm long resembling a traditional bottle brush, each flower with a tubular calyx, small white petals, and several protruding 3–4 cm long stamens. The flowers give way to pear-shaped capsules containing polished, brown seeds.

The Latin specific epithet parviflora means "small-flowered".

Cultivation and uses
Aesculus parviflora is grown as an ornamental plant in gardens, where its August flowering attracts butterflies. It prefers moist, well-drained soils in part shade to full shade. In the US, it is suitable for USDA hardiness zones 4–8.

The naturalist, explorer and plant collector William Bartram first noted this undescribed shrub on his travels through Carolina, Georgia and Florida in 1773–78. An old example was still to be found in Bartram's Garden, Philadelphia, in 1930.

Aesculus parviflora was introduced to British horticulture through the activities of John Fraser, who made his first botanizing trip through the American South in 1785. Fraser's finds were distributed among English nurserymen like Lee and Kennedy or Loddiges or to private patrons, and the shrub was "to be met with in most of our nurseries" by 1820. This plant has gained the Royal Horticultural Society's Award of Garden Merit.

Gallery

References

External links

 
Plants for a Future: Aesculus parviflora

Flora of the Southeastern United States
Plants described in 1788
parviflora
Trees of the United States